Tiago Cardoso dos Santos (born 1984) is a Brazilian footballer who plays as a goalkeeper for Santa Cruz.

Tiago Cardoso or Thiago Cardoso may also refer to:
Tiago Cardoso Mendes (born 1981), known as Tiago, Portuguese football midfielder and assistant manager
Tiago Cardoso Fonseca (born 1983), known as Tiaguinho, Brazilian football defender
Thiago Ribeiro Cardoso (born 1986), Brazilian football forward
Thiago Cardoso (born 1991), Brazilian football defender
Thiago Cardozo (born 1996), Uruguayan football goalkeeper

See also 
Tiago (disambiguation)